Wheatville is an unincorporated community in Preble County, in the U.S. state of Ohio.

History
A post office called Wheatville was established in 1853, and remained in operation until 1857. Wheatville contained a German Baptist church.

References

Unincorporated communities in Preble County, Ohio
1853 establishments in Ohio
Populated places established in 1853
Unincorporated communities in Ohio